Mitzi Ferguson (born 29 September 1959) is an Australian fencer. She competed in the women's individual foil event at the 1980 Summer Olympics.

References

1959 births
Living people
Australian female foil fencers
Olympic fencers of Australia
Fencers at the 1980 Summer Olympics